The Los Angeles Metropolitan Transit Authority (sometimes referred to as LAMTA or MTA I) was a public agency formed in 1951. Originally tasked with planning for rapid transit in Los Angeles, California, the agency would come to operate the vestiges of defunct private transit companies in the city.

History
Formed in 1951, LAMTA's original mandate was to do a feasibility study for a monorail line which would have connected Long Beach with the Panorama City district in the San Fernando Valley via Downtown Los Angeles.

The agency's powers were expanded in 1954, authorizing it to study and propose an extensive regional transit system. In 1957, another expansion of the agency's powers authorized it to operate transit lines, and it subsequently purchased the bus and streetcar lines then being operated by Metropolitan Coach Lines, which had taken over passenger service of the Pacific Electric Railway in 1953, as well as the bus and streetcar lines of the Los Angeles Transit Lines, successor to the Los Angeles Railway. Both companies, as well as MCL subsidiary Asbury Rapid Transit System, were acquired for $34 million (equivalent to $ in ). The MTA began operating the lines on March 3, 1958, and continued to do so until the agency was taken over by the Southern California Rapid Transit District on November 5, 1964.

During the MTA's tenure, the last remaining rail transit lines in Los Angeles were abandoned and replaced with bus service, the last former Pacific Electric line in April 1961, and the last former Los Angeles Railway lines in 1963.

Services

Rail lines

Trolley bus

Bus

See also
 Jim Wilson (Los Angeles), MTA secretary

References

External links
Mass transit plans in Los Angeles since 1951 (2.6MB PDF file)
Photo of MTA 1543 in Compon, 1960

1951 establishments in California
1964 disestablishments in California
Government of Los Angeles
History of Los Angeles
Transportation in Los Angeles
Defunct public transport operators in the United States
Public transportation in Los Angeles County, California
Passenger rail transportation in California
Electric railways in California
Bus transportation in California
Transit agencies in California